Morpho telemachus is a Neotropical butterfly.

Description
Morpho telemachus is a large butterfly. The upperside of the forewings is a silver grey and blue green with a very wide black-brown outer edge. This is also on the posterior wings and can even cover almost all of the hindwings and forewings. There is a black band on half of the costal edge from the base.

The underside is copper brown with a line of black white and orange ocelli black white and orange, in an arc on both the hindwings and forewings.

Subspecies
M. t. telemachus Suriname, Guyana, French Guiana, Venezuela
M. t. iphiclus C. & R. Felder, 1862 Ecuador, Colombia, Peru, Bolivia, Brazil (Amazonas, Pará)
M. t. lilianae Le Moult, 1927 Venezuela 
M. t. ssp. Ebert, MS Brazil (Pernambuco)

Behaviour
In 1913, Hans Fruhstorfer wrote:
"According to Michael perseus [synonym for telemachus] is never seen fluttering round flowers, nor do the butterflies seem to require food or drink. They prefer rather to soar through the spaces of the illimitable forests like Morpho hecaba or to float along in unrestricted flight over the tops of the trees in a deep valley. According to Hahnel perseus is one of the highest-flying Morphids and on account of its brown under surface, which looks very dark against the light sky, it gives the impression, when flying at a height of 8-10 m, of a black coloured species. Hahnel says that the butterflies, which in spite of their lively, jerky movement through the air scarcely flap the wings appreciably, present a charming spectacle, particularly when half a dozen or more meet and engage in a sham fight. Almost the whole morning such scenes are repeated, for only towards midday, after they have been flying over their wide domain for 2 or 3 hours, do their pinions become weary and they settle again in the shade of the branches on some large leaf, the back turned towards the dark and the eyes towards the open. One rarely finds even a single insect flying in the afternoon and then probably only when unfavourable weather has hindered its doing so in the morning. The butterflies occasionally dart down on to yellow Papilio females drinking on the ground, undoubtedly taking them for their own females which are also frequently yellow, and Dr. Hahnel took advantage of this by fastening pieces of yellow paper in his net, which actually deceived the perseus males."

Etymology
The species is named in the classical tradition for Telemachus, a figure in Greek mythology, the son of Odysseus and Penelope, and a central character in Homer's Odyssey.

References

Le Moult (E.) & Réal (P.), 1962-1963. Les Morpho d'Amérique du Sud et Centrale, Editions du cabinet entomologique E. Le Moult, Paris.
Paul Smart, 1976 The Illustrated Encyclopedia of the Butterfly World in Color. London, Salamander: Encyclopedie des papillons. Lausanne, Elsevier Sequoia (French language edition)  page 231 fig.5 f. metellus Cr., underside(Brazil)

External links

"Morpho Fabricius, 1807" at Markku Savela's Lepidoptera and Some Other Life Forms

Morpho
Fauna of Brazil
Nymphalidae of South America
Butterflies described in 1758
Taxa named by Carl Linnaeus